Kitselas, Kitsalas or Gits'ilaasü are one of the 14 tribes of the Tsimshian nation of British Columbia, in northwestern Canada. The original name Gits'ilaasü means "people of the canyon." The tribe is situated at Kitselas, British Columbia, at the upper end of Kitselas Canyon, which is on the Skeena River. It was once a great trading nexus, just outside and upriver from the city of Terrace. It is the most upriver of the 14 tribes and it borders the territory of the Gitxsan nation.

Location
Today, the Kitselas people live mostly at two Indian reserves, one, at the Kulspai or Queensway reserve ("New Town"), is just across the river from Terrace.  More recently, Kitselas people have begun to repopulate a more traditional and remote site on a bluff overlooking the Canyon, at Gitaus reserve (Git'aws meaning "people of the sand").  Gitaus is gradually becoming the centre of Kitselas life.

From the 1870s until the 1960s, many Kitselas and Kitsumkalum Tsimshians lived at the cannery town of Port Essington, farther down the Skeena River (now a ghost town), at the confluence of the Ecstall and Skeena Rivers.

Governance 
Until its dissolution in 2005, the Tsimshian Tribal Council represented Kitselas in treaty negotiations with the provincial and federal governments. Its band government is the Kitselas First Nation.

William Beynon and the anthropologist Marius Barbeau recorded traditional information from Kitselas people at Port Essington, B.C., in 1924, including Chief Walter Wright and Chief Samuel Wise, who held the Kitselas Laxsgiik (Eagle-clan) name Gitxon.

Following are the house-groups (matrilineal extended families) of the Kitselas:

House of Gagawtsgan -- Laxsgiik (Eagle clan)
House of Gitxon—Laxsgiik (Eagle clan)
House of Iyuu's -- Laxsgiik (Eagle clan)
House of G'wam -- Ganhada (Raven clan)
House of Niis'hawas -- Gispwudwada (Killerwhale clan)
House of Niis'nagwalk—Laxsgiik (Eagle clan)
House of Lax'Stell—LaxGibu (Wolf clan)
House of Niis'taxo'ok—Gispwudwada (Killerwhale clan)
House of Sats'an—Ganhada (Raven clan)
House of Niis'Gitlope—Laxgiik (Eagle clan)
House of Stee How—LaxGibu (Wolf clan)

Detailed narratives were also recorded from Chief Walter Wright (Niistaxo'ok) in the 1930s and collected in a volume called Men of Medeek.

See also
Kitselas First Nation
Kitselas Canyon

Bibliography

 Barbeau, Marius (1950) Totem Poles.  2 vols.  (Anthropology Series 30, National Museum of Canada Bulletin 119.)  Ottawa: National Museum of Canada.
 Berthiaume, Rocque (1999) The Gitselasu: The People of Kitselas Canyon.  Terrace, B.C.: First Nations Education Centre, School District 82 (Coast Mountains).
 Coupland, Gary (1988) Prehistoric Cultural Change at Kitselas Canyon.  Hull, Quebec: Canadian Museum of Civilization.
 Haldane, Agnes, et al. (1992)  Conflict at Gits'ilaasü.  (Suwilaay'msga Na Ga'niiyatgm, Teachings of Our Grandfathers, vol. 6.)  Prince Rupert, B.C.: School District No. 52.
 Marsden, Susan (ed.) (1992)  Na Amwaaltga Ts'msiyeen: The Tsimshian, Trade, and the Northwest Coast Economy.  (Suwilaay'msga Na Ga'niiyatgm, Teachings of Our Grandfathers, vol. 1.)  Prince Rupert, B.C.: School District No. 52.
 McDonald, James A. (2003) People of the Robin: The Tsimshian of Kitsumkalum. CCI Press.
 Robinson, Will (1962) Men of Medeek.  As told by Walter Wright.  Kitimat, B.C.: Northern Sentinel Press

External links
Kitselas First Nation website

Tsimshian
Skeena Country